Vipāka (Sanskrit and Pāli) is a Buddhist term for the ripening or maturation of karma (Pāli kamma), or intentional actions. The theory of karmic action and result (kamma-vipāka) is a central belief within the Buddhist tradition.

Alternate translations
The term vipaka is translated as:
 effect (Ven. D. Mahinda Thera)
 maturation (Keown, 2000, loc 810–813)
 ripening (Harvey, 1990, p. 39)
 result

Within the discourses
The Samyutta Nikaya states:

See also 
 Karma in Buddhism
 Phala
 Rebirth

References

Sources

External links
 Anguttara Nikaya, Chakka Nipata, Mahavagga, Nibbedhika Sutta, p. 359, 6th Syn. Edn.
 Samyutta Nikaya. Nidana-samyutta, Bhumija Sutta, p. 275, 6th Syn. Edn

Buddhist philosophical concepts
Karma in Buddhism